Cassius Willis is an American actor, who has guest starred in various TV shows and movies. He most recently was seen in the recurring roles of Det. Gil Wallace on the CBS soap opera The Young and the Restless and Det. Robert Gunther on the ABC serial drama Revenge. He appeared in the 2014 film Earth to Echo.

Filmography

References

American male soap opera actors
American male television actors
Year of birth missing (living people)
Living people